Cristigibba wesselensis is a species of air-breathing land snail, a terrestrial pulmonate gastropod mollusk in the family Camaenidae. This species is endemic to Australia.

References

Gastropods of Australia
Cristigibba
Gastropods described in 1868
Taxonomy articles created by Polbot